Spodnji Mamolj (in older sources Dolenji Mamolj) is a former settlement in the Municipality of Litija in central Slovenia. It is now part of the village of Mamolj. The area is part of the traditional region of Lower Carniola and is now included with the rest of the municipality in the Central Sava Statistical Region.

Geography
Spodnji Mamolj stands in the southeastern part of Mamolj, on the road to Gradiške Laze.

History
Spodnji Mamolj had a population of 40 living in five houses in 1900. Spodnji Mamolj was annexed by Mamolj in 1953, ending its existence as a separate settlement.

References

External links
Spodnji Mamolj on Geopedia

Populated places in the Municipality of Litija